The Loktantrik Morcha was formed on 4th June 2013 as a seven-party alliance of left-wing parties and other supporting parties in Rajasthan, India. The Communist Party of India (Marxist) leader Amra Ram is the chief ministerial candidate.

The front included the CPI(M), the Communist Party of India, the Communist Party of India (Marxist-Leninist), the Marxist Communist Party of India (United), the Samajwadi Party, and the Janata Dal (Secular). Later, the only RLD MLA announced support for the Congress government.

Members

References

Marxist Communist Party of India (United)
Political party alliances in India
Politics of Rajasthan
Left-wing politics in India
2018 in Indian politics